POSCO International Corporation (포스코인터내셔널) is South Korea's largest trading company and a subsidiary of POSCO.

The company was founded by Kim Woo-choong in 1967 as Daewoo Industrial Co., Ltd, which ran its business in trading and construction. In 1999, the company faced at least $50 billion in debt, Daewoo became formally dismantled. In 2000, as Daewoo Group faced work-out program, Daewoo Industrial Co., Ltd's trading segment was split and established as "Daewoo International Corporation". Afterwards, it succeeded general trading license and was listed on stock market back again. In 2016, Company name changed "Daewoo International" to "POSCO Daewoo". After merge with Posco P&S in 2017, the company name was changed to current "POSCO International Corporation" in 2019

On 2 November 2020, POSCO International and Erae AMS will supply the Vietnamese carmaker VinFast with electrical vehicle (EV) components.

It aims to issue ESG bonds for first time for Korean trading companies in year 2021.

In year 2022, Posco International acquired Australian gas and energy company Senex

In year 2023, Posco International merged with its sister company Posco Energy. Intergrating upstream and downstream LNG movement.

Operations 
POSCO INTERNATIONAL Corporation has its head office in Posco Tower - Songdo, 165, Convenisa-daero, Yeonsu-gu, Incheon, 21998, Korea. Its global network consists of over 100 overseas branches and subsidiaries.

Business sectors
As of Dec, 2020. Company has re-organized as below: Main purpose of organization change is to boost steel sales and put emphasis on hydrogen energy, secondary cell battery, smart farming.

Steel 1 - Export/Triangular sales: Hot rolled steel, Cold rolled steel, Billet & Wires, Energy & shipbuilding steel, Automotive steel 

Steel 2 - Domestic/Import sales: Flat steel, Construction materials & plates, Steel raw materials, Stainless steel 

Energy - E&P, Gas operations, Energy, Resource development 

Agro & Materials - Agro, Mobility, Nonferrous, Eco-friendly materials

Splits steel processing and manufacturing sectors as subsidiary, and names POSCO SPS.

History

References 

Annual < Financial Highlights Tools < Financial Information < IR < DAEWOO INTERNATIONAL CORPORATION
reuters.com

External links 
 
 Daewoo International (archived)

POSCO
Companies of South Korea
Companies listed on the Korea Exchange
Companies based in Seoul